Universitas Indonesia Station (UI) is a railway station located in Pondok Cina, Beji, Depok. This station is located on the eastern perimeter of University of Indonesia complex. This station is one of two railway stations serving University of Indonesia, along with Pondok Cina station (casually pronounced  or "), about 1 kilometer to the south which is located closer to the university rectorate building.

KRL Commuterline users at this station are dominated by the University of Indonesia students and local people who live around the campus area. This station is between Pondok Cina Station and Universitas Pancasila Station. Its position inside the campus environment causes the frequency of crowds inside the station to be seen only during the hours of entering and leaving the office/campus. Unlike the stations located on the Manggarai-Depok route, whose canopy forms the letter Y, the canopy for UI Station (and also Tebet Station) forms the letter T.

This is due to the majority of KRL Commuterline passengers are used to using multi-trip cards and electronic money. In this way, long queues to buy KRL tickets can be cut. However, service users can still tap-in/tap-out with THB at this station.

Building and layout 
This station has two railway tracks.

Services
The following is a list of train services at the Universitas Indonesia Station.

Passenger services 
 KAI Commuter

Supporting transportation
About 50 meters from the station there is a bus stop for the Yellow Bus, a transportation on the University of Indonesia's campus for transportation between faculties.

Incidents 

 On 22 December 2008 at around 14.08 WIB, a 14-year-old boy was electrocuted by overhead line (LAA) on the roof of KRL with train number KA 456 bound for Jakarta Kota, the incident took place between Universitas Indonesia Station and Universitas Pancasila Station. The KRL trip was delayed for up to 30 minutes due to the overhead line blackout from Universitas Indonesia Station to Tanjung Barat Station to evacuate the victim's body, and was immediately taken to the authorities.
As a result of this incident, a number of KRL trips that passed this station were delayed because the Economy KRL on which the child was traveling (bound for Jakarta Kota) could not depart because the victim's body had only been evacuated 20 minutes later to the Indonesian National Police Hospital in Kramat Jati, East Jakarta.
 On 11 April 2015 at 18:00 WIB, a tree fell in the area of ​​the University of Indonesia Station and destroyed the side of the platform and made the KRL lines impassable, a number of KRL series from the direction of Jakarta or Bogor were delayed for more than two hours, especially the trip to Bogor with train numbers 1184, 1188, 1628, 1192. The route can only be traversed again at 20.30 WIB.

References

External links
 

Buildings and structures in Depok
Railway stations in West Java
Railway stations at university and college campuses